Nergis Öztürk (born 25 May 1980) is a Turkish actress. She has appeared in more than twelve films since 2006.

Filmography

References

External links 

1980 births
Living people
Turkish film actresses
Turkish television actresses
Best Actress Golden Orange Award winners
People from Kandıra